Castleman Run Lake Wildlife Management Area is located on  near in Brooke and Ohio counties near Bethany, West Virginia. The moderate slopes are covered with mixed hardwoods, brushy vegetation, and open fields.

Hunting and Fishing
Hunting opportunities, limited by the small size of the area, include deer, raccoon, squirrel, turkey and grouse. Fishing includes largemouth bass, bluegill, catfish, muskellunge, tiger musky, northern pike, and trout.  Boating, with electric motors only, is permitted on the small lake.  Camping is prohibited at this WMA.

See also

Animal conservation
Hunting
List of West Virginia wildlife management areas
Recreational fishing

References

External links
 West Virginia DNR District 1 Wildlife Management Areas
West Virginia Hunting Regulations
West Virginia Fishing Regulations
WVDNR Map of Castleman Run Lake Wildlife Management Area

Wildlife management areas of West Virginia
Protected areas of Brooke County, West Virginia
Protected areas of Ohio County, West Virginia
IUCN Category V